Asutosh Law was an Indian politician and Lawyer. He was elected to the Lok Sabha, lower house of the Parliament of India from Dum Dum in 1984. He was a student of St. Xavier's College, Kolkata and later studied law in University College of Law, Calcutta. 

Asutosh Law also served as the chairman of the Parliamentary Estimates Committee and a director of Allahabad Bank.

References

External links
 Official biographical sketch in Parliament of India website

1940 births
People from West Bengal
India MPs 1984–1989
Lok Sabha members from West Bengal
2013 deaths
St. Xavier's College, Kolkata alumni
People from North 24 Parganas district
Indian National Congress politicians